Robert Kiviat is a television writer and producer specializing in paranormal phenomena. He has produced 11 specials for 20th Century Fox Television, most notably Alien Autopsy.  Robert has also often appeared as a guest expert on numerous television news shows, such as MSNBC's Countdown with Keith Olbermann, and on popular radio shows such as Coast to Coast AM, Art Bell, and The Jeff and Mike Show. He has been featured on Entertainment Tonight multiple times, Access Hollywood, and CNN's Show Biz Tonight.

Originally from New York, Robert Kiviat relocated to Hollywood after producing mystery segments for Geraldo Rivera's TV newsmagazine Now It Can Be Told, and after writing a cover article for OMNI Magazine about the supposed Face on Mars, a mile-wide mesa photographed by NASA.

Robert was soon asked to join NBC's  Unsolved Mysteries. Soon the Fox Network brought Robert in for a phenomenon-based show called Encounters, and shortly thereafter Robert secured exclusive rights to the  footage that was the basis for his first Fox TV Special, Alien Autopsy: Fact or Fiction?.

Productions
  Aliens On The Moon: The Truth Exposed
  I Shot JFK: The Shocking Truth
 World's Greatest Hoaxes: Secrets Finally Revealed
  Miracles and Visions: Fact or Fiction?
  Prophecies of the Millennium
 UFOs: The Best Evidence Ever Caught on Tape
 UFOs: The Best Evidence Ever Caught on Tape 2
 Ghosts Caught on Tape: Fact or Fiction?
 Alien Autopsy: (Fact or Fiction?)
  Alien Autopsy: The True Story
  Why In The World Do They Do That?
 Unsolved Mysteries

External links
 
 Coast to Coast AM's page on Robert Kiviat
 
 NASA Comments on UFO Video
 1997 Press Release about Prophecies of the New Millennium
 1995 Time Magazine article "Autopsy or Fraud-Topsy?"
 Bigfoot Article mentioning Kiviat
 1996 Omni Interview with Kiviat
 1997 CNI Article about Alien Autopsy
 Ufolitics Television Series on Twitter @ufolitics

Living people
Year of birth missing (living people)
American television producers
American television writers
American male television writers